Friedrich Ris (1867 – 1931 in Glarus) was a Swiss physician and entomologist who specialised in Odonata.
He was Director of a psychiatric clinic in Rheinau, Switzerland.

Swiss entomologists
1867 births
1931 deaths